Carl Leon Stewart (born 2 May 1997) is an English professional footballer who plays as a midfielder for Northwood.

Career
A graduate of the Watford youth system, Stewart spent half a season in Italy with the youth team of Udinese in 2015, before returning to Watford. He made his competitive debut for Watford on 7 January 2017 in their 2–0 home FA Cup victory against Burton Albion, coming on as a 97th minute substitute for Jerome Sinclair.

In April 2018, Watford announced that Stewart would be released at the conclusion of his contract in June 2018.

In August 2018 Stewart signed for National League South side Oxford City. After two league appearances, he joined Banbury United in October 2018 before having spells with Bedfont Sports and Wingate & Finchley.

On 12 July 2019, Stewart joined Polish I liga side Zaglebie Sosnowiec on a two-year deal. In February 2020, Stewart joined III liga side Piast Żmigród on loan until the end of the season.

Stewart returned to England and joined Isthmian League side Marlow in October 2020.

After a short spell at Rayners Lane, Stewart joined Southern League Premier Division South side Beaconsfield Town in 2021.

In November 2021, Stewart joined Northwood - initially on dual-registration from Beaconsfield before making the move permanent in the summer of 2022.

References

External links

Profile at Aylesbury United

1997 births
Living people
Footballers from Hammersmith
Watford F.C. players
Oxford City F.C. players
Banbury United F.C. players
Wingate & Finchley F.C. players
Bedfont Sports F.C. players
Marlow F.C. players
Rayners Lane F.C. players
Beaconsfield Town F.C. players
Northwood F.C. players
Association football midfielders
English footballers
English expatriate footballers
English expatriate sportspeople in Poland
Expatriate footballers in Poland
I liga players
III liga players
National League (English football) players
Southern Football League players
Isthmian League players